The Silver Greyhound may refer to:

 The Silver Greyhound (1919 film), a British silent film
 The Silver Greyhound (1932 film), a British film

See also
Silver Greyhound, badge of the Queen's Messengers